Lacrosse Australia (LA) is the governing body for the sport of Lacrosse in Australia.

History

Lacrosse in Australia has a long and proud history dating back to 1876, with a small but dedicated community of participants and volunteers. The established centres for the game are in the greater metropolitan areas of Melbourne, Adelaide, and Perth. In these cities there are organised Saturday field lacrosse competitions for men and women at senior and junior levels, played over the winter months (April until September). In the off-season, there are informal box lacrosse and sofcrosse competitions, though the majority of players in Australia are foremostly of the field lacrosse type. Some lacrosse is also played in Sydney, Brisbane and Hobart, although it is very much at the developmental level.

Until 2007, men's and women's lacrosse were administered by separate governing bodies (Lacrosse Australia and Women's Lacrosse Australia). These organisations merged in 2007 to form the Australian Lacrosse Association (ALA). In 2021 the ALA rebranded as Lacrosse Australia and remains the single governing body for all formats of lacrosse in Australia.

Structure 
The national body has six state member associations:
 Lacrosse Victoria
 Lacrosse South Australia
 Lacrosse Western Australia
 Queensland Lacrosse Association
 Lacrosse New South Wales
 Lacrosse Tasmania

See also

 Lacrosse in Australia
 List of Australian Lacrosse national champions

References

External links
 
 

Lacrosse in Australia
Australia
Lacrosse
2007 establishments in Australia
Sports organizations established in 2007